Cool Ideas is a South African Internet service provider, providing FTTH services to the South African consumers.

A proposed merger with Afrihost, another ISP, has been approved by the Competition Commission, South Africa's anti-monopoly regulator.

References

External links 
 

Telecommunications companies of South Africa
Internet service providers of South Africa